Leo Proost (1 November 1933 – 24 May 2016) was a Belgian cyclist. His best achievements were in motor-paced racing, in which he won the world championships in the professionals category  in 1963, 1967 and 1968, as well as national titles between 1963 and 1968. During his career Proost took part in 25 six-day races, winning the race of Antwerp in 1963.

References

1933 births
2016 deaths
Belgian male cyclists
UCI Track Cycling World Champions (men)
Cyclists from Antwerp Province
People from Oud-Turnhout
Belgian track cyclists
20th-century Belgian people